The Hamiltonhill Branch was constructed by the Caledonian Railway in 1894 with the intention to provide a large goods yard at Hamiltonhill on the Forth and Clyde Canal. There was also a branch to the Saracen Foundry but this had to be closed as it was in breach of an agreement with the North British Railway.

History 

The Hamiltonhill yard closed at an early date, however the section of the line was extended by the Lanarkshire and Dunbartonshire Railway to Dumbarton and gave the Caledonian Railway access to Balloch, linking through to the Garnkirk and Glasgow Railway to the east. Part of the route between Eastfield and Possil was built along the course of an old waggonway which had run from pits at Eastfield to the Forth and Clyde Canal at Ruchill.

Much of the former trackbed is still visible to this day.

Current operations
The line is now closed.

Connections to other lines
 Lanarkshire and Dunbartonshire Railway at Possil Junction
 Garnkirk and Glasgow Railway at Balornock Junction
 The Caledonian Railway Switchback at Balornock Junction

References

External links 
 Google Maps

Closed railway lines in Scotland
Caledonian Railway